The Canton of Céret is a French former canton of Pyrénées-Orientales department, in Languedoc-Roussillon. It had 22,167 inhabitants (2012). It was disbanded following the French canton reorganisation which came into effect in March 2015.

History 
The canton of Céret was created in 1790 as part of the district of Céret, and then of the arrondissement of Céret.

The commune of Les Cluses was separated from the canton of Laroque and attached to the canton of Céret in 1801.

Following various incidents the elections of 1858 for the canton of Céret were cancelled in 1859 and a new councillor was then elected.

The commune of L'Albère was separated from the canton of Argelès-sur-Mer and attached to the canton of Céret in 1947.

Composition
The canton comprised the following communes:

Céret 
L'Albère
Banyuls-dels-Aspres
Le Boulou
Calmeilles
Les Cluses
Maureillas-las-Illas
Montauriol
Oms
Le Perthus
Reynès
Saint-Jean-Pla-de-Corts
Taillet
Vivès

References 

Céret
Ceret
2015 disestablishments in France
States and territories disestablished in 2015